Beranang (Chinese: 峇玲瓏) is a town and a mukim in Hulu Langat District, Selangor, Malaysia.

Residential areas

 Eco Majestic
 Bandar Rinching
 Bandar Tasik Kesuma
 Bandar Bukit Mahkota

Transportation

Car 

Federal Route 1 (Kuala Lumpur-Johor Bahru road) runs through Beranang town.

Public transport 
Rapid Bus T450 to Kajang central business district (Stadium Kajang MRT).

References

Hulu Langat District
Towns in Selangor
Mukims of Selangor